Diamonds and Dirt is the first solo studio album by Scottish guitarist Brian Robertson, released in 2011. Robertson was previously a member of Thin Lizzy, Motörhead and Wild Horses.

Robertson recruited several experienced musicians for the recording of this album, including Treat bass guitarist Nalle Påhlsson and Europe drummer Ian Haugland, who Robertson described as "the best rhythm section I've played with since Phil Lynott and Brian Downey". Ex-Michael Schenker Group vocalist Leif Sundin performed most of the vocals, but the album also features Robertson himself and Riverdogs singer Rob Lamothe singing on one track each.

The album includes some tracks by Robertson's old group Thin Lizzy: "It's Only Money" from the 1974 album Nightlife, two versions of "Running Back" from the 1976 album Jailbreak, and "Blues Boy", a track recorded by the band but never officially released until it appeared as a bonus track on the deluxe edition of the Jailbreak album. "Blues Boy" was co-written by Robertson and Phil Lynott, while the other two songs were composed by Lynott alone. Robertson has stated, "I think Phil would be proud of what I've done with those Lizzy songs." Robertson also recorded three songs written by his friend Frankie Miller, including a bonus track, "Ain't Got No Money". Robertson initially sang the song himself, but Miller suggested it would suit a different vocalist, so Rob Lamothe was brought in.

Track listing
"Diamonds and Dirt" (Brian Robertson)
"Passion" (Robertson)
"It's Only Money" (Phil Lynott)
"Mail Box" (Frankie Miller)
"Running Back" (Lynott) 
"Texas Wind" (Robertson)
"Devil in My Soul" (Robertson)
"Do It Till We Drop (Drop It)" (Miller, Jeff Barry, Robertson)
"Blues Boy" (Robertson, Lynott)
"That's All!" (Robertson)
"10 Miles to Go on a 9 Mile Road" (Jim White)
"Running Back" (Slow version) (Lynott)
"Ain't Got No Money" (Miller)*

* Bonus track

Personnel
Brian Robertson – guitar, keyboards; vocals on "10 Miles to Go on a 9 Mile Road"
Leif Sundin – vocals
Nalle Påhlsson – bass guitar, backing vocals
Ian Haugland – drums, percussion
Liny Wood – backing vocals
Rickard Jakobson – percussion

with
Chris Antblad – piano on "Running Back"
Rob Lamothe – vocals on "Ain't Got No Money"
Ola Gustafsson – dobro on "Running Back" (Slow version)
Ellinor Asp – backing vocals on "Ain't Got No Money"
Håkan Persson – drums on "Ain't Got No Money"

References

External links
Diamonds and Dirt at AllMusic

2011 debut albums
Brian Robertson albums